Ochagavia elegans is a plant species in the genus Ochagavia. This species is endemic to the Juan Fernández Islands in the South Pacific, off the coast of Chile.

References

elegans
Endemic flora of Chile
Juan Fernández Islands
Plants described in 1856